Kilcoolaght East Ogham Stones (CIIC 206–213) are a collection of ogham stones forming a National Monument located in County Kerry, Ireland.

Location

History

The stones were carved in the 5th and 6th centuries AD and served as burial markers. This was a ceallurach (burial ground).

All the stones were found in a souterrain nearby.

Description

The stones are sandstone pillars.

CIIC 206: [AN]M VIRR[ACC(?)]/ANNI TIGIR[N] ("name/inscription of Ferchán/Fírchán? of Tigern") and C̣/̣ṬẸDATTOQA MAQI/ VEDELMETṬ[O(?)] ("of Cétadach? son of Fedelmid/Feidlimid")
CIIC 207: ẸCC MAQI L[UGUQ]ṚRIT ("of ? son of Luccreth")
CIIC 208: UMALL 
CIIC 209: A]GGO MAQI AGỊ[LL ("...ggo son of Agi...")
CIIC 210: DUBE[B  and Q/N
CIIC 211: [RI]TTẠVV[E]CC MAQ[I] V[E]DDONỌS ("of Rethach son of Feddonos"; this name survives in the Iveragh Peninsula)
CIIC 212: highly fragmentary
CIIC 213: URG̣

References

National Monuments in County Kerry
Ogham inscriptions
5th-century inscriptions
6th-century inscriptions